is a railway station on the Kōnan Railway Kōnan Line in Hirakawa, Aomori, Japan, operated by the private railway operator Kōnan Railway Company.

Lines

Station layout
Hakunōkōkōmae Station has a one side platform serving a single bi-directional track. The station is unattended.

Adjacent stations

History
Hakunōkōkōmae Station was opened on June 23, 1980, primarily to serve the local Prefectural Hirakawa Agricultural High School.

Surrounding area
Prefectural Hirakawa Agricultural High School.

See also

 List of railway stations in Japan

External links
 
Location map  

Railway stations in Aomori Prefecture
Konan Railway
Hirakawa, Aomori
Railway stations in Japan opened in 1980